Scott Anthony Simpson (born 4 November 1959) is a New Zealand politician and a member of the New Zealand House of Representatives. He is a member of the National Party.

Early life and career
Simpson's ancestors settled in Kūaotunu, on the Coromandel Peninsula, in the 1800s. He grew up in Auckland and was educated at the University of Auckland, graduating with a law degree.

He was chief executive of the New Zealand Make-a-Wish Foundation from 2008 to 2011, and previously a member of the National Party board of directors. He also managed a safety equipment company.

He was married to Desley Simpson, but the couple separated ca. 2004/2005. She is now married to Peter Goodfellow. The former couple has two children.

Political career

Member of Parliament

Simpson has been MP for Coromandel since 2011, and served as Minister of Statistics, Associate Minister of Immigration and Associate Minister for the Environment at the close of the Fifth National Government.

Prior to his election to Parliament, Simpson held senior positions in the National Party. He was National Party Northern Regional Chair and a member of the National Party's Board of Directors in the 2010s. He stood for the National Party presidency in 2009 but lost to Peter Goodfellow. He previously stood for selection as the National Party candidate for Tamaki in 2004, but lost to Allan Peachey.

Simpson was selected as the National Party's Coromandel candidate in April 2011. He was elected at the 2011 general election with a majority of 12,740. From 2013 to 2014, Simpson was chair of the Justice and Electoral select committee.

During the 2014 New Zealand general election, Simpson was re-elected in Coromandel by a margin of 15,801, defeating the Green Party's candidate Catherine Delahunty. Simpson chaired the Local Government and Electoral select committee until his appointment in May 2017 as Minister of Statistics, Associate Minister of Immigration and Associate Minister for the Environment.

During the 2017 New Zealand general election, Simpson was re-elected in Coromandel by a margin of 14,326 votes over Labour's Nathaniel James Blomfield. The National Party was not in Government and Simpson served as his party's spokesperson for the environment, workplace relations and safety, and climate change.

During the 2020 New Zealand general election, Simpson retained Coromandel for a fourth term by a final margin of 3,505 votes over Labour's Nathaniel James Blomfield.

Views 
In the National Party caucus, Simpson is a liberal. He voted in favour of the Marriage (Definition of Marriage) Amendment Act 2013, the End of Life Choice Act 2019 and the Abortion Legislation Act 2020.

He has led the National Party's advisory group on environmental issues, the Bluegreens.

References

Place of birth missing (living people)
Living people
New Zealand National Party MPs
Members of the New Zealand House of Representatives
New Zealand MPs for North Island electorates
1959 births
21st-century New Zealand politicians
Candidates in the 2017 New Zealand general election